Titanic: Music from the Motion Picture is the soundtrack to the film of the same name composed, orchestrated, and conducted by James Horner. The soundtrack was released by Sony Classical/Sony Music Soundtrax on November 18, 1997.

Riding the wave of the film's immense success, the soundtrack shot to the top of the charts in nearly two-dozen territories, selling over 27 million copies, making it one of the top 100 best-selling albums in the United States. It is one of the best-selling albums of all time, and the highest-selling primarily orchestral soundtrack ever.

In 2012, the album, along with its successor Back to Titanic (1998), was re-issued as part of the Collector's Anniversary Edition set for the 3D re-release of the film. In 2017, La-La Land Records released the 20th Anniversary Edition in a limited edition 4-disc release.

In 2022, on the film's 25th anniversary, the album was released on LP in a limited edition of 7,500 copies. The set included 2 LPs in a gatefold sleeve, an 8-page booklet, an XL poster, and a print replica of the historical New York Times frontpage.

Album information
Director James Cameron originally intended Enya to compose the music, and in fact put together a rough edit of the film using her music as a temporary soundtrack. After she declined, he approached James Horner. Their relationship was strained after their first collaboration in Aliens, but the soundtrack of Braveheart made Cameron overlook it. Horner composed the soundtrack having in mind Enya's style; Norwegian singer Sissel Kyrkjebø performed the wordless vocals on the soundtrack.

Horner knew Sissel from the album Innerst i sjelen and he particularly liked how she sang the song Eg Veit I Himmerik Ei Borg ("I Know in Heaven There Is a Castle"). Horner had tried 25 or 30 singers and, in the end, he chose Sissel to sing the wordless tune.

Céline Dion, who was no stranger to movie songs in the 1990s, since her contribution to Walt Disney's Beauty and the Beast, sang "My Heart Will Go On", the film's signature song written by James Horner and Will Jennings. At first, Cameron did not want a song sung over the film's ending credits, but Horner disagreed. Without telling Cameron, he went ahead and wrote the song anyway, and recorded Dion singing it. Cameron changed his mind when Horner presented the song to him. "My Heart Will Go On" became a worldwide smash hit, going to the top of the music charts around the world. "My Heart Will Go On" also ended up winning the 1997 Academy Award for Best Original Song as well as the Golden Globe Award for Best Original Song in 1998.

Other artists were invited to submit songs for the movie including contemporary Christian artist Michael W. Smith. He mentions in the liner notes to the song "In My Arms Again" from his 1998 album Live the Life; "Inspired and written for the movie Titanic, grateful for the opportunity to send them a song; grateful it landed on this record."

For the choral background of certain tracks, Horner made use of a digital choir instead of a real one; after the orchestral music was recorded, Horner personally performed the synthesized choir over a playback of the recording. The idea behind using electronics, rather than a real choir, stemmed from Horner wanting to avoid a 'church'-like sound.

Principal leitmotifs

Throughout the film, the composer created themes for particular characters, events, locations, and ideas.
"Hymn to the Sea" — A sorrowful, melancholic theme which expresses the tragic side of the Titanic. It's also featured prominently in "Never An Absolution". This theme contains uilleann pipes and vocals by Sissel Kyrkjebø. An alternate version is first heard in the film's opening sequence. Furthermore, the track contains a menacing, descending, three-note motif which signifies the wreck of the ship and is first featured when Titanics wreck site comes in view at the beginning of the film. 
"Southampton" — Uplifting, adventurous and rather heroic-sounding theme which signifies the spectacle of the Titanic. This melody features an electronic choir and snare drum clumps. 
"Distant Memories" — This leitmotif contains synth choir vocals and an aquatic, chiming tone. This piece is first heard when old Rose is taken aboard the "Keldysh".
"Rose" — The sentimental theme of the film that is associated with the romance between Jack and Rose. Whilst in the major key for the most parts, this leitmotif's rousing chorus modulates to the relative minor key. The theme features orchestral violin, strings and piano. Electronic choir intrudes at times. Sissel Kyrkjebø performs the wordless vocals of this theme. This theme is first heard when Jack sees Rose for the first time on the deck and it would usually interpose during sequences when other music is playing, such as in "Hard to Starboard" and "Death of the Titanic".
"Hard to Starboard" — This piece contains the ominous leitmotif associated with the iceberg (i.e. "Iceberg Theme"), which is first heard when the iceberg is spotted. It also contains a percussion-heavy, pulsating motif that corresponds to the peril and danger the characters endure during the sinking. Anvils are extensively used in this track.
"Death of Titanic" — This track contains a descending, tumid and foreboding motif that also corresponds to peril and danger. It is played during the scene where the ship slowly starts to submerge into the ocean. To note, the descending cue is also heard in other tracks (i.e. "Unable to Stay, Unwilling to Leave"), such as when Jack and Rose are chased by Cal, although it sounds slightly altered.
"2 1/2 Miles Down" — Although this track is mostly incidental, ambient music with droning synth voices and eerie strings, it features the menacing, descending, three-note motif which signifies the wreck of the ship and is first featured when Titanics wreck site comes in view at the beginning of the film, which is also heard in "Hymn to the Sea".

Commercial performance
Titanic: Music from the Motion Picture became the highest-selling primarily orchestral film score in history, with worldwide sales surpassing 30 million copies. The soundtrack quickly moved up the US Billboard 200, going from number eleven to number one on the chart in January 1998, keeping Shania Twain's Come On Over and Madonna's Ray of Light from reaching the top spot. It remained at the top for sixteen straight weeks until it was replaced by the Dave Matthews Band album Before These Crowded Streets. No album would spend at least ten consecutive weeks at number-one until Adele's 21 in the winter of 2012. The soundtrack has been certified 11× Platinum for 11 million copies shipped in the United States, becoming the best-selling album of 1998, and the fastest-certified soundtrack album ever.

The soundtrack also hit number-one in at least 14 other countries, including the United Kingdom, Canada, and Australia. The soundtrack was certified 5× Platinum by the ARIA in Australia for 350,000 copies shipped. It was certified 3× Platinum in the United Kingdom for over 900,000 copies shipped; and was certified diamond by the CRIA in Canada for 1 million copies shipped. The soundtrack is the best-selling non-Chinese CD album in Taiwan, selling 1.1 million copies.

The soundtrack's success led to the release of a second volume, called Back to Titanic which contained a mixture of previously unreleased soundtrack recordings and newly recorded performances of some of the songs in the film, including one track recorded by Clannad (of which Enya is an ex-member) singer, Máire Brennan. Back to Titanic was certified platinum by the RIAA.

Track listing

Standard edition

Two-Disc Anniversary Edition

All tracks performed by I Salonisti.

Four-Disc Collector's Anniversary Edition

All tracks performed by I Salonisti.

20th Anniversary Edition

Personnel 
Adapted from AllMusic.
 Andy Bass – assistant engineer
 Bob Bornstein – music preparation
 James Cameron – liner notes
 Sandy De Crescent  – orchestra contractor
 Celine Dion – primary artist, vocals
 Simon Franglen – producer, keyboards
 Marc Gebauer – scoring engineer
 Frank Harkins – art direction, design
 Jim Henrikson – supervising music editor
 Anthony Hinnigan – tin whistle
 James Horner – composer, conductor, primary artist, producer, keyboards
 Will Jennings – lyricist
 Randy Kerber – keyboards
 Lesley Langs – assistant music editor
 David Marquette – assistant engineer
 Shawn Murphy – engineer, mixing, recording
 Joe E. Rand – music editor
 Eric Rigler – Uilleann pipes
 Jay Selvester – scoring engineer
 Sissel – vocals
 Kirsten Smith – scoring engineer
 Pat Sullivan – mastering
 Ian Underwood – keyboards, woodwinds

Charts

Weekly charts

Monthly charts

Year-end charts

End-of-decade charts

Best of all time charts (Top 200)

Certifications and sales

See also
 List of best-selling albums
 List of best-selling albums in Brazil
 List of best-selling albums in China
 List of best-selling albums in Europe
 List of best-selling albums in France
 List of best-selling albums in Germany
 List of best-selling albums in Italy
 List of best-selling albums in Japan
 List of best-selling albums in the Philippines
 List of best-selling albums in Taiwan
 List of best-selling albums in the United States
 List of diamond-certified albums in Canada

References

External links
 (via Sony BMG Masterworks)

James Horner albums
1997 soundtrack albums
Titanic (1997 film)
Sony Classical Records soundtracks
Scores that won the Best Original Score Academy Award